Albert D. Dixon (born April 5, 1954) is a former American football tight end in the National Football League (NFL) for the New York Giants, the Kansas City Chiefs, the Philadelphia Eagles, and the San Francisco 49ers.  He played college football at Iowa State University and was drafted by the Giants in the seventh round (178th pick overall) of the 1977 NFL Draft.

Dixon was a member of the 49ers during their 1984 championship season, appearing in two games against the Los Angeles Rams and Cincinnati Bengals, although he is not listed among the players who actually took the field for the team's victory in Super Bowl XIX.

References

1954 births
American football tight ends
Iowa State Cyclones football players
Kansas City Chiefs players
Living people
New York Giants players
People from Drew, Mississippi
Philadelphia Eagles players
San Francisco 49ers players